Del Monte may refer to:

Places
 Del Monte Airfield, a heavy bomber-capable airfield in the Philippines
 Del Monte, California, an unincorporated community in Monterey County, California
 Brunyarra, now known as Del Monte, is a historic house in Strathfield, New South Wales, Australia

Others
 Del Monte Foods, an American food production and distribution company
 Fresh Del Monte Produce, an American fruit production and distribution company
 Del Monte (train), a passenger train run by the Southern Pacific Railroad
 del Monte (surname)

See also
 Delmont (disambiguation)
 Delmotte